Pabna Government Girls High School is one of the oldest secondary schools in Pabna District, Bangladesh. The school provides education from class Three to class Ten (SSC). It has two shifts - morning and day. The morning shift starts from 7.30 am and day shift from 12.30 pm. It is a girls school but has both male and female teachers. The school has one head master and two separate group of teachers for morning and day shift. It has a playground, three buildings and a mosque. There are individual laboratories for physics, chemistry, biology, and computer.

History
Pabna Government Girls' High School was established in 1883.

Location

References

Educational institutions established in 1983
Girls' schools in Bangladesh
High schools in Bangladesh
1983 establishments in Bangladesh